Rutesheim station is a railway station in the municipality of Rutesheim, located in the Böblingen district in Baden-Württemberg, Germany.

References

Stuttgart S-Bahn stations
Buildings and structures in Böblingen (district)